Tengo Fe is the eighth album by Colombian singer/composer Carlos Vives, released on August 12, 1997.

Track listing
 "Tengo Fé" (C. Vives, C. Medina) – 3:43
 "Qué Diera" (C. Vives) – 4:12
 "Buenos Tiempos" (C. Vives) – 3:51
 "Pambe" (C. Vives) – 3:46
 "Amores Escondidos" (C. Vives, E. Cuadrado) – 3:41
 "Interior" (C. Vives, C. Medina) – 3:33
 "Sol de Mediodía" (C. Vives) – 2:59
 "Cumbia Americana" (C. Vives) – 4:11
 "Malas Lenguas" (C. Vives)– 4:15
 "El Caballito" (Traditional Arrangement) – 3:44

Album credits

Performance Credits
Carlos Vives - Primary Artist, Vocals
Egidio Cuadrado - Accordion
Luis Angel Pastor - Bass
Heberth Cuadrado - Caja
Luis Diaz - Cello
Yesid Torres V. - Chicote
La Provincia - Choir, Chorus
Roberto Milanes - Double Bass
Pablo Bernal - Drums
Einar Escaf - Drums, Percussion
Mayte Montero - Gaita
Eder Polo - Guacharaca
Andrés Castro - Guitar
Carlos Huertas - Guitar
Ernesto "Teto" Ocampo - Guitar
Carlos Ivan Medina - Keyboards, Piano
Gilbert Martínez - Percussion
Alfredo Rosado - Tamboura
Ricardo Hernández - Viola
Mario Diaz - Violin
Technical Credits
La Provincia - Arranger
Tommy Afont - Engineer
Ray Bardani - Engineer
Carlos Vives - Producer
Ted Jensen - Mastering

Popular culture
In Chile, the song was featured in one episode of Chilean Radio OhMyGeek!

External links
 Carlos Vives official website

1997 albums
Carlos Vives albums